Nicholas Melady Jr. (1845 – December 7, 1869)  was the last person to be publicly executed in Canada. He was hanged on December 7, 1869, on the outside wall of a jail located in Goderich, Ontario, for the murder of his father, Nicholas Melady Senior and his stepmother Ellen. The murders are believed to have been committed on the evening of June 6, 1868, on a farm in the present day municipality of Huron East, south of the current community of Seaforth, Ontario. Melady's trial was surrounded by controversy at the time, with allegations of perjury, lost and planted evidence, as well as the unusual use of a female police informant, who posed as a criminal and feigned affection for Melady while he was imprisoned, in an attempt to gain a confession from him. The informant, named in records as "Jenny Smith", was the wife of a local police officer. During the course of the investigation into the crime, seven other members of the Melady family, as well as two other male individuals, were initially jailed as suspects and later released. Melady's execution occurred several hours in advance of the officially announced time it was to occur in an attempt to avoid the civil disorder that sometimes accompanied public hangings. It is reported that a crowd of several thousand people were present at the jail at the originally announced time of the execution, many of whom are reported to have shouted their disapproval of the altered schedule of events. On January 1, 1870, three weeks after Melady was hanged, a Canadian federal government Order in Council came into effect that banned all future public executions in Canada.

General references
Melady, John (2005). Double Trap: The Last Public 
Hanging In Canada. Dundern Press. 

1845 births
1869 deaths
People executed for murder
Executed Canadian people
People executed by Canada by hanging
Canadian people convicted of murder
People convicted of murder by Canada
19th-century executions by Canada
Patricides